Francisco D'Alessandri (born 21 June 1930) is an Argentine equestrian. He competed in the individual dressage event at the 1964 Summer Olympics.

References

External links
 

1930 births
Living people
Argentine male equestrians
Argentine dressage riders
Olympic equestrians of Argentina
Equestrians at the 1964 Summer Olympics
Pan American Games medalists in equestrian
Pan American Games silver medalists for Argentina
Equestrians at the 1963 Pan American Games
Place of birth missing (living people)
Medalists at the 1963 Pan American Games